Cissura bilineata is a moth of the family Erebidae first described by Orfila in 1935. It is found in Paraguay.

References

Phaegopterina
Moths described in 1935